The following is a list of Nebraska Territory units formed during the American Civil War. Some saw action only on the frontier in the Indian Wars. The state raised one regiment of infantry (subsequently converted to cavalry), two regiments (including the converted infantry) and a battalion of cavalry (successor of the second cavalry regiment), several companies of militia, and two scout companies.

Infantry
 1st Nebraska Infantry Regiment
 1st Nebraska Militia

Cavalry
 1st Nebraska Cavalry Regiment
 1st Nebraska Veteran Cavalry  Battalion
 2nd Nebraska Cavalry Regiment
 Independent Company "A" Pawnee Scouts, Nebraska Cavalry
 Independent Company Omaha Scouts, Nebraska Cavalry
 Stuff'ts Independent Company of Indian Scouts, Nebraska Cavalry

See also
 Lists of American Civil War regiments by state
 Nebraska in the American Civil War

References
  
The Civil War Archive

 
Nebraska
Civil War